Senator King may refer to:

Members of the United States Senate
Angus King (born 1944), U.S. Senator from Maine since 2013
John Pendleton King (1799–1888), U.S. Senator from Georgia from 1833 to 1837
Preston King (politician) (1806–1865), U.S. Senator from New York from 1857 to 1863
Rufus King (1755–1827), U.S. Senator from New York from 1813 to 1825
William H. King (1863–1949), U.S. Senator from Utah from 1917 to 1941
William R. King (1786–1853), U.S. Senator from Alabama from 1848 to 1852

United States state senate members
Alvin Olin King (1890–1958), Louisiana State Senate
Bryan King (politician) (born 1968), Arkansas State Senate
Curtis King (politician) (fl. 2000s–2020s), Washington State Senate
Daniel P. King (1801–1850), Massachusetts State Senate
Edward King (Ohio politician) (1795–1836), Ohio State Senate
Frank W. King (1912–1988), Ohio State Senate
Henry King (congressman) (1790–1861), Pennsylvania State Senate
Jean King (1925–2013), Hawaii State Senate
Jeff King (politician) (born 1975), Kansas State Senate
Jessica King (born 1975), Wisconsin State Senate
Jim King (politician) (1939–2009), Florida State Senate
John A. King (1817–1900), New York State Senate
John A. King (1788–1867), New York State Senate
John G. King (politician) (born 1942), Massachusetts State Senate
Johnathan P. King (1794–1860), Michigan State Senate
Keith King (born 1948), Colorado State Senate
Leicester King (1789–1856), Ohio State Senate
Nancy J. King (born 1949), Maryland State Senate
Ralph E. King (1902–1974), Louisiana State Senate
Samuel Ward King (1786–1851), Rhode Island State Senate
Steve King (Colorado legislator) (born 1965), Colorado State Senate
Steve King (born 1949), Iowa State Senate
Thomas Butler King (1800–1864), Georgia State Senate
Tom King (Mississippi politician) (born 1947), Mississippi State Senate
William R. King (judge) (1864–1934), Oregon State Senate
William King (governor) (1768–1852), Massachusetts State Senate